Ulenyai Khwairakpam (born 27 December 2003) is an Indian cricketer. He made his List A debut on 25 February 2021, for Manipur in the 2020–21 Vijay Hazare Trophy.

References

External links
 

2003 births
Living people
Indian cricketers
Manipur cricketers
Place of birth missing (living people)